Sholakia is a locality near Kishoreganj town in Bangladesh. It is famous for its Eidgah where the largest congregation of Eid prayer in Bangladesh is held on the occasion of Eid ul-Fitr, the day of celebration after the Ramadan, the month of fasting. 400,000 people join the prayer on every Eid. The Eidgah, on the bank of river Narosunda is reported to be  in size, accommodating 250 rows or about 150,000 of participants for every congregation. An equal number of participants take part in the prayer using the fields, roads and courtyards around the Eidgah.

A small number of elites make use of the two-storied mimbar (prayer hall with towers for adhan) nearby, which can accommodate about 500 people. The prayer on the occasion of Eid ul-Adha, the festival of qurbani or sacrifice, is also comparably large. The regular population of Sholakia is 1,026, consisting 180 households.

Organization
Farid Uddin Masud has been conducting the eid prayers since 2009.  The Eidgah has an executive committee of 51 members with the District Commissioner (DC) as the president. For every congregation, district police administration deploys a large number of police officers equipped with metal detectors, mine detectors and close circuit cameras. Medical teams and fire brigades are also kept alert during the prayers. Eid ul-Fitr is the biggest religious festival in the Muslim-dominated Bangladesh, followed by Eid ul-Adha.

History
Syed Ahmed, a saint (known as peer) and an Islamic leader of Kishoregonj lived in Sholakia, Shaheb bari, organised the first Eid congregation in 1828 in the fields of his own taluk. Syed Ibrahim, Father of Syed Ahmed came from what is now Saudi Arabia through Yemen and then he came to India.  He preached Islam in 24 Porganas of India and protested against different Subversive activities of British against the locals. Then he migrated to Comilla and then at Mymensingh. After few years later Syed Ibrahim went to Mecca to observe the Hajj. But His wife lived in Nikli of Kishoregonj. By this time Syed Ahmed took born. He educated at Azimpur, Dhaka and He participated in Fakir movement from Mymensingh. Later, towards the end of the 18th century, he moved to Sholakia, Shaheb Bari to begin Islamic activities. In 1827 he founded the first Mosque of Kishoreganj at Sholakia, Shaheb Bari. He observed different Islamic activities at the majar of Bora Pir (Shah Monnoon, other opinion the name was Moyezuddin Moznu) of Kishoregonj at Sholakia, Shaheb Bari The local myth says that 125,000 people turned out at that congregation, hence the name Sholakia (shoa meaning one and a quarter and lakh meaning a hundred thousand). During foundation of Eidgah, Zamindar of Jangalbari and Hybathnagor helped Syed Shaheb. Dewan Mannan Dad Khan of Hybathnagor, who was a descendant of Isa Khan, donated  of land to the Eidgah in 1950.

Other features

Sholakia, standing by Kishoreganj-Karimganj road, the commercial artery of the area, is almost free from arsenic contamination of groundwater, a menace in the Ganges Basin and elsewhere Binangladesh. Divided into Kharompatty and Kolapara mahallas, Sholakia has a sporting club, Sholakia Sporting Club, that takes part in local level soccer tournaments. Manufacturing bricks and tiles is a major commercial activity here.

2016 bombing
On 7 July 2016, half an hour before prayers were to begin Thursday morning, a bombing at the site killed two police officers and a civilian. A group of men approached a police checkpoint, at a high school near the prayer ground, and set off a bomb, said Tofazzel Hossain, an assistant superintendent of the Kishoreganj police. "They attacked the police out of nowhere," said Mr. Hossain, who said some of the attackers had been carrying guns and bladed weapons. Six other police officers were seriously wounded, said a police inspector, Mueid Chowdhury, but they were expected to survive. At least five civilians were also hurt. The police killed one of the attackers and arrested two others, Mr. Hossain said. A search was underway for the other assailants. There was no immediate claim of responsibility for the attack.

Notable Eidgahs in Bangladesh
 Gor-e-Shahid Eidgah Maidan, in Dinajpur City 
 Dhanmondi Shahi Eidgah, in Dhaka
 Sylhet Shahi Eidgah, in Sylhet
 Baitul Mukarram

References

11. muktijoddharkantho

External links
 Abdul Karim, Mr. Abdul Karim Islam in Mymensingh, Islamic Foundation Bangladesh

Islam in Bangladesh
Geography of Dhaka Division